The Church of the Blessed Sacrament is a Roman Catholic parish within the Archdiocese of Seattle serving Seattle's University District. It is the only parish in the Archdiocese to be owned and operated by the Order of Preachers and is within the jurisdiction of the Western Dominican Province. The church's current prior is Fr. Augustine Hilander, and the pastor is Fr. Dominic David Maichrowicz.

The church building, its priory, and its parish school building (19130 were added to the National Register of Historic Places in 1984 as As Church of the Blessed Sacrament, Priory, and School. Damage from the 2001 Nisqually earthquake led to extensive repairs in 2010. It ministers to the Catholic student population of the University of Washington through the Prince of Peace Newman Center, which is the fifth-oldest Newman Center and first to be run by the Dominican Order.

The church is unique among the Order of Preachers because of its practice of appointing yearly Dominican seminarians, friars in their last year of formation, who serve as "Student Brothers" for one year, working with both the pastor of Blessed Sacrament and the team at the University of Washington Newman Center to deliver Catechesis to a variety of public audiences.

The priory, completed in 1922, was designed by Arnold Constable.

The school, designed by the Beezer Brothers, completed in 1913, was a  two-story woodframe structure. "Because of numerous building and fire code violations, the building was condemned in 1948. Plans to demolish the existing structure and erect a new parish hall on the site will probably be executed in the near future".  A replacement school was built in 1950 already?

References

External links

Blessed Sacrament Church
Prince of Peace Catholic Newman Center

National Register of Historic Places in Seattle
Dominican churches in the United States
Roman Catholic churches in Seattle
Churches on the National Register of Historic Places in Washington (state)
Roman Catholic churches in Washington (state)
Roman Catholic Archdiocese of Seattle
University District, Seattle